PlayNow.com is an online gambling website owned and operated by the British Columbia Lottery Corporation (BCLC). Launched in 2004, it first expanded into online casino games in 2010 offering online table games, slots, and sports betting. The site has since expanded into other provinces in Western Canada, as part of partnerships with Manitoba Liquor & Lotteries Corporation and the Saskatchewan Indian Gaming Authority (SIGA).

History 
PlayNow first launched in 2004, initially allowing users to purchase BCLC lottery products online.

In July 2010, PlayNow added online blackjack, craps, and roulette, becoming the first legal online casino in Canada. BC Minister of Housing and Social Development Rich Coleman stated that the service aimed to provide a legal alternative to unregulated online gambling services, so revenue could stay within the province and support local causes. The service cost $7.3 million, and was developed with OpenBet.

Shortly after launch, PlayNow was taken down for maintenance. The operators initially stated that its servers had crashed due to high demand, but later stated that the site had been taken down due to a security flaw caused by the load and a "defect in the error handling logic", which caused users to gain access to other users' accounts. The BCLC stated that 134 accounts had been affected by the issue. On July 27, Privacy Commissioner Elizabeth Denham stated that the BCLC had agreed to keep PlayNow offline until an independent review is completed. The service resumed operations in August 2010.

In February 2011, PlayNow added online poker; via a platform operated by gaming vendor GTech, games would be linked with Loto-Québec's Espacejeux.

In January 2013, PlayNow expanded to Manitoba via a partnership with the Manitoba Lotteries Corporation.

In November 2022, PlayNow launched in Saskatchewan; it is operated in partnership between the BCLC and the Saskatchewan Indian Gaming Authority (SIGA), as part of an agreement reached with the provincial government in 2022.

Player safety and security
Gambling education and resources are embedded into PlayNow.com,  including:
 Age and residency controls with independent identity verification
 Player pre-set deposit limit with 24-hour delay for all increase request.
 Session logs that show time and amount spent.
 Purchase history so players can track play and spending for up to 52 weeks.
 Responsible play and problem gambling help information on all pages.
 Username and password-protected accounts, secure payment methods and strict privacy controls.
 Players must use a verified credit card to deposit money into their account.
 GameSense information to help players: make choices and understand games, the odds and the potential risks.
 A 1-week waiting period to be able to re-bet the same selection after betting the limit.

References

External links
 PlayNow.com Official Website
 British Columbia Lottery Association Official Website

Online gambling companies of Canada